Leonard Seweryn Krasulski (born 8 November 1950 in Sopot) is a Polish politician. He was elected to the Sejm on 25 September 2005, getting 7777 votes in 34 Elbląg district as a candidate from the Law and Justice list.

See also
Members of Polish Sejm 2005-2007

External links
Leonard Krasulski - parliamentary page - includes declarations of interest, voting record, and transcripts of speeches.

1950 births
Living people
People from Sopot
Law and Justice politicians
Members of the Polish Sejm 2005–2007
Members of the Polish Sejm 2007–2011
Members of the Polish Sejm 2011–2015
Members of the Polish Sejm 2015–2019
Members of the Polish Sejm 2019–2023